Iker Bravo Solanilla (born 13 January 2005) is a Spanish professional footballer who plays as a forward for Spanish club Real Madrid Castilla, on loan from Bundesliga club Bayer Leverkusen.

Club career
Scouted by Barcelona at the age of 5 while playing for CFA Espluguenc, Bravo joined La Masia and was part of their youth academy until signing with the German club Bayer Leverkusen on 28 July 2021. He made his professional debut with Leverkusen as a late substitute in a 2–1 DFB-Pokal loss to Karlsruher SC on 27 October 2021. At 16 years, 9 months and 15 days, Bravo was the youngest ever debutant for Leverkusen, taking the record from Florian Wirtz. On 7 November 2021, Bravo debuted for Bayer Leverkusen in the Bundesliga in a 1–1 tie with Hertha; at 16 years and 298 days he was briefly the second youngest ever Bundesliga debutant and youngest ever for Bayer Leverkusen, before being passed by his teammate Zidan Sertdemir in the same game.

On 29 August 2022, Bravo was registered with Primera Federación's Real Madrid Castilla, on a 1-year loan from Leverkusen. On 4 September, Bravo was called up for Real Madrid's squad for the UEFA Champions League match against Celtic. On 17 September, Bravo scored his first goal for Real Madrid Castilla, winning the match against San Sebastián de los Reyes by 5-1.

International career
Bravo is a youth international for Spain, having represented the Spain U15s and Spain U17s.

Career statistics

Club

References

External links
 DFB profile
 Real Madrid profile
 
 
 

2005 births
Living people
People from Sant Cugat del Vallès
Sportspeople from the Province of Barcelona
Spanish footballers
Association football forwards
Spain youth international footballers
Bundesliga players
Bayer 04 Leverkusen players
Real Madrid Castilla footballers
Spanish expatriate footballers
Spanish expatriate sportspeople in Germany
Expatriate footballers in Germany